Francis Patrick Ubertelli is a composer and writer born in Quebec City, Canada in 1968.

Biography 
Ubertelli studied composition and musical history and theory at the Conservatoire de Québec under Armando Santiago. After having earned his graduate degree, he completed an advanced degree in composition with Franco Donatoni at the Accademia Nazionale di Santa Cecilia in Rome. In 1995, he founded the Black Jackets Company with composers Pierre Kolp, Juan Carlos Tolosa and David Nuñez. During that time, he attended master classes with Ennio Morricone, Luciano Berio, Pascal Dusapin et Philippe Boesmans. Returning to Canada, he completed his doctoral studies at the Université de Montréal with Michel Longtin in 2000, where his thesis was eventually refused.

Following a decisive encounter, he studied Catholic theology and put a temporary hold on his composition projects. After extensive travels and the publication of his first novel in 2011, he returned to composition in 2015.

Teaching career 
Ubertelli was a member of the Ontario College of Teachers from 2007 to 2015. On February 9, 2015, he was found guilty of professional misconduct, with his certificate of qualification and registration suspended for a period of one month; As a result of the investigation, he is inactive, and non-practicing.

He is the principal of L’école Sainte-Marie Mère de Dieu, a private school in Ottawa, Ontario.

List of works 
 Litanies of Saint George for string orchestra
 Cantate Domino, Invocations for grand ensemble & soprano
 Demain(s) for piano, violin & cello
 Sol for eight flautists
 Approches for piano
 Délivrance for nine instruments
 DesCoeurs for violin
 Seul in memoriam henri bernier for trombone
 Palio dopo (Opgedragen aan Dirk Proost, geestenziener) for five instruments
 Limites murmures for violin & bass
 Manu for tenor and bass trombones
 Regard for fourteen instruments
 A Franco Donatoni, scritto come mangio for orchestra
 Quatuor 1 for string quartet
 Palio for five instruments
 Voix triangulaires, anamorphoses for grand ensemble

Prizes and scholarships 
 "Accomplished Musician 2002" laureate, IBLA Foundation, New York;
 Millennium Scholarship, Government of Canada, May and September 2000;
 Université de Montréal, Fonds des Études Supérieures, January, September 1999; January, June and September 2000; February 2001;
 Canada Council for the Arts, January 1995, February 2000;
 Conseil des Arts et Lettres du Québec, May 1994;
 Monte dei Paschi di Siena, August 1994.

References 

Canadian composers
Canadian male composers
Université de Montréal alumni
1968 births
Living people